(French for art books or books of art) are books in which the illustration holds a predominant place in relation to the text. They often require high quality papers as they belong in the category of high quality publications.

History 
According to a presentation from Élie Faure's  (originally published from 1919–1921), the livre d'art is a new genre within the field of modern art, where each commentary (text) can be compared to the works (works of art, images) themselves, the juxtaposition and confrontation of images justifying the audacity of the connections between text and image which sometimes seem unusual.

The books were produced in pocket format and intended for a general audience. Since 1980, the  has been presented on an annual basis to reward the best livre d'art.

The "Découvertes" collection launched by Éditions Gallimard in 1986 is a new kind of artistic encyclopaedia with a dynamic page layout. Produced in pocket format and illustrated in colour, these books treat a wide range of subjects such as arts, archaeology, history, literature, music, philosophy, religion, sports, technology, all based on an abundant pictorial documentation and a way of bringing together visual documents and texts, enhanced by printing on coated paper. As commented in L'Express: "All served by omnipresent iconography, which is in harmony with the text. [...] In short, genuine monographs, published like art books. [...] 'Découvertes' changed the face of encyclopaedism and art book, adapting the book to the era of 'zapping'."

In 2003, the Prix Livre d'art of the awards ceremony La Nuit du livre was established by Élisabeth Chainet, according to her, the prize "celebrates beauty in books, these masterpieces that reveal two talents: that of the author, whether he is a writer, photographer or illustrator, but also that of the manufacturer. The beauty of a book is in fact the result of a perfect encounter between the intellectual world of the author and the technical world of the manufacturer." Mimmo Paladino's  and  became the first winners of the prize, which are outstanding for their "adequacy between Paladino's illustrations and Homer's texts, the quality of page layout by Richard Médioni, the choice of paper, typography, binding, etc."

See also 

 Bible moralisée
 Biblia pauperum
 Artist's book
 Book Art
 Book of Common Prayer (1845 illuminated version)
 Coffee table book
 Fine press
 Graphic novel
 Golden Age of Illustration
 Illuminated manuscript
 Miniature (illuminated manuscript)
 Picture book
 World of Art

References 

Book design
Books by type
Illustrated books
Visual arts media